D. giganteus may refer to:
 Dinornis giganteus, the south island giant moa, an extinct bird species found in New Zealand
 Dyoplosaurus giganteus, a synonym for Tarchia giganteus, an ankylosaurid dinosaur species from the late Cretaceous of Mongolia